Armando Álvarez Álvarez (born 18 July 1970 in Colmar, Alsace) is a Spanish former professional footballer who played as a right back.

Honours
Atlético Madrid
Segunda División: 2001–02

See also
List of Spain international footballers born outside Spain

External links
 
 
 
 

1970 births
Living people
People from Colmar
French people of Spanish descent
Spanish footballers
Association football defenders
Spain international footballers
La Liga players
Segunda División players
Segunda División B players
Tercera División players
Real Oviedo Vetusta players
Real Oviedo players
Deportivo de La Coruña players
RCD Mallorca players
Atlético Madrid footballers
Sportspeople from León, Spain
Footballers from Castile and León
Footballers from Alsace